How to Talk to Girls at Parties is a 2017 science fiction romantic comedy film directed by John Cameron Mitchell and written by Philippa Goslett and Cameron Mitchell, based on the 2006 short story of the same name by Neil Gaiman. The film stars Elle Fanning, Alex Sharp, Nicole Kidman, Ruth Wilson and Matt Lucas. Principal photography began on 9 November 2015, in Sheffield.

The film had its world premiere at the 2017 Cannes Film Festival on 21 May 2017. It was released in the United Kingdom on 11 May 2018, by StudioCanal UK, and in the United States on 25 May 2018 by A24.

Premise
A young punk named Enn and his best friends stumble upon a bizarre gathering of teenagers from another planet, visiting Earth to complete a mysterious rite of passage. Enn falls madly in love with Zan, a beautiful and rebellious alien who becomes fascinated with him. Together, they embark on a delirious adventure through the kinetic punk rock world of 1970s London, inadvertently setting off a series of events that leads to the ultimate showdown between punks and aliens.

Cast
 Elle Fanning as Zan, a rebellious young alien curious about Earth
 Alex Sharp as Enn, a punk comic book artist and Zan's love interest
 Nicole Kidman as Queen Boadicea, an old-school punk who manages the local punk hangout
 Ruth Wilson as PT Stella, one of the alien leaders
 Matt Lucas as PT Wain, one of the alien leaders
 Abraham Lewis as Vic, Enn's best friend
 Ethan Lawrence as John, Enn's other best friend
 Edward Petherbridge as PT First, the alien supreme leader
 Joanna Scanlan as Marion, Enn's mother
 Tom Brooke as PT Waldo, Zan's parent, one of the alien leaders
 Martin Tomlinson as Slap, a punk singer managed by Boadicea
 Rory Nolan as young Enn, Zan and Enn's Son
 Cris Haris as Teddy Boy

Filming
Principal photography on the film began on November 9, 2015, in Sheffield, which would be standing in for London.

Release
In September 2015, A24 acquired U.S. distribution rights to the film. It had its world premiere at the Cannes Film Festival on May 21, 2017. It was released in the United Kingdom on 11 May 2018 and in the United States on 25 May 2018.

Critical response
On Rotten Tomatoes, the film has an approval rating of 48% based on 96 reviews, with an average rating of 5.3/10. The website's critical consensus reads, "How to Talk to Girls at Parties has energy and ambition, but is ultimately too unfocused to do much with either — or develop its themes into a cohesive whole." On Metacritic, the film has a weighted average score of 50 out of 100, based on 24 critics, indicating "mixed or average reviews".

David Rooney of The Hollywood Reporter stated that despite the charming characters of Elle Fanning (a curious alien) and Nicole Kidman (a nihilistic low priestess), its attempts to "add political substance feels less than half-cooked" and in effect sacrifices "narrative cohesion" and "overcomplicates" Neil Gaiman's 18-page story.
Owen Gleiberman of Variety wrote: "The film enunciates its raw themes — punk means individuality! the aliens are all about conformity! — but never begins to figure out how to embody those themes in a narrative that could lure in the audience."

References

External links 
 
 
 
 
 "How to Talk to Girls at Parties" original source short story by Neil Gaiman.

2017 films
2017 independent films
2017 romantic comedy films
2017 science fiction films
2010s science fiction comedy films
A24 (company) films
American romantic comedy films
American science fiction comedy films
British romantic comedy films
British science fiction comedy films
Films based on science fiction short stories
Films based on works by Neil Gaiman
Films directed by John Cameron Mitchell
Films scored by Nico Muhly
Films set in the 1970s
Films set in London
Films shot in London
Films shot in South Yorkshire
HanWay Films films
Punk films
2010s English-language films
2010s American films
2010s British films